Nicole Vermast (born 6 March 1968) is a road cyclist from the Netherlands. She represented her nation at the 1998 UCI Road World Championships.

References

External links
 profile at cyclingarchives.com

1968 births
Dutch female cyclists
Living people
Place of birth missing (living people)
UCI Road World Championships cyclists for the Netherlands
Cyclists from Amsterdam